Nicorette II is a  sailing yacht built in 1999 in South Africa. The yacht was designed by Simonis & Voogd. She won line honours in the 2000 Sydney to Hobart Yacht Race skippered by Ludde Ingvall.

References

1990s sailing yachts
Sailing yachts built in South Africa
Sailing yachts of Sweden
Sydney to Hobart Yacht Race yachts